A UCI Women's Team is a women's road bicycle team sanctioned by the International Cycling Union (UCI). These teams compete in the major women's bicycle races including the UCI Women's Road World Cup and the team time trial for trade teams at the UCI Road World Championships.

The country designation of each team is determined by the country of registration of the most its riders, and is not necessarily the country where the team is registered or based.

Current teams

Former UCI Women's teams

Teams by year

1998

1999

2000

2001

2002

2003

2004

2005

2006

2007

2008

2009

2010

2011

2012

2013

2014

2015

2016

2017

2018

2019

2020

2021

References

External links
UCI Women's Team

 
Women's cycling teams
Women's road cycling
Women's Teams